Raquel García-Tomás (born 1984 Barcelona) is a Spanish composer specialized in multidisciplinary and collaborative works. She was awarded the 2017 Critical Eye Awards, and 2020 Premio Nacional de Música, in Composition , which is awarded  by the Spanish Ministry of Culture and Sports.

Career 
She graduated from the Royal College of Music in London, the city where she lived for six years. She has made compositions with the English National Ballet, the Royal Academy of Arts and the Dresdener Musikfestspiele. She has collaborated as a composer and video creator with Matthias Rebstock in the creation of Büro für postidentisches Leben, which premiered at the Grec Festival and at the Neuköllner Oper Berlin. She was a guest composer at the Barcelona Auditorium's Sampler Series contemporary music cycle in the 2015-2016 season, with the work Blind Contours no. 1, performed by Oslo Sinfonietta. 

Other ensembles from which she has received commissions or  collaborated with are, Phace Ensemble, Ensemble Contemporáneo Orquesta de Cadaqués, Madrid Symphony Orchestra, Càmera Musicae, Experimental Funktion, CrossingLines Ensemble, Ensemble Sonido Extremo, Cosmos Quartet, Barcelona Clarinet Players, Barcelona Reed Quintet, BCN 216 and PluralEnsemble.

During the 2019-2020 season, she was composer-in-residence at Fundació Catalunya-La Pedrera. In October 2020, she was awarded a BBVA Foundation Leonardo Scholarship to create, together with librettist Irène Gayraud and the stage director Marta Pazos, a new opera, Alexina B. which will premiere at the Gran Teatre del Liceu on 18 March 2023. The opera is inspired by the memoirs of Herculine Barbin. On 13 May 2022, she premiered at L'Auditori, a choral symphonic work, Suite of Myself, musically based on Bach's St. John Passion and with libretto from poems by Walt Whitman.

References 

1984 births
Spanish composers
Living people
Spanish women composers